Khaneh-ye Barq may refer to:
 Khaneh-ye Barq-e Isa Khani
 Khaneh-ye Barq-e Jadid
 Khaneh-ye Barq-e Qadim